T.Q.M. is the third album by Spanish singer Melody. She released it in 2003, at the age of 12.

The album was produced by Luis G. Escolar and Julio Seijas. One music video, for the first single titled "Será", was shot.

The album debuted at number 84 in Spain for the week of 28 July 2003. The album sold 30,000 copies, which was a decline from De pata negras 500,000 and Muévetes 50,000.

Track listing

Charts

References

External links 
 

2003 albums
Melody (Spanish singer) albums
Sony Music albums